Diana Caroline Whalen (born November 20, 1956) is a Canadian politician, who represented the electoral district of Halifax Clayton Park in the Nova Scotia House of Assembly from 2003-2013, and Clayton Park West from 2013-2017, as a member of the Nova Scotia Liberal Party.

Early life and education
Whalen was born in Bay Shore, New York. She graduated with a BA and MBA from Dalhousie University.

Before politics
Whalen worked in South Korea, Australia and Jamaica from 1980 to 1988 before returning to Halifax to raise her family. Holding the designation Certified Management Accountant (CMA), Whalen worked as a management consultant for 15 years.

Whalen was part of the planning team for the 21st G7 summit which took place in Halifax from June 15–17, 1995.  In the late 1990s, Whalen founded a community action group dedicated to seeing a new P-9 school built in her fast-growing neighbourhood of Clayton Park West.

Political career
Whalen was elected to Halifax Regional Council in the 2000 municipal election, representing District 16 Prince's Lodge-Clayton Park West.

In 2003 Whalen successfully ran for the Nova Scotia Liberal Party nomination in the riding of Halifax Clayton Park.  She was elected in the 2003 provincial election and was subsequently re-elected in the 2006, 2009 and 2013 provincial elections.

In 2004, Whalen's private members bill for mandatory booster seats was passed by the legislature. Whalen worked with constituents in her riding to lobby both the Halifax Regional Municipality and the provincial government for improved recreational infrastructure. This resulted in construction of the Canada Games Centre which opened on the Mainland Common in November 2010.

On January 18, 2007, Whalen confirmed after much speculation that she would run for the leadership of the Nova Scotia Liberal Party. She lost on the second ballot of the leadership to Stephen McNeil by 68 votes, despite the support of the two other candidates in the race, Kenzie MacKinnon and Mike Smith.

On October 22, 2013 Whalen was appointed to the Executive Council of Nova Scotia by McNeil, as Deputy Premier and Minister of Finance.

Whalen has been an advocate for a provincial February holiday since 2005 when she first introduced the Joseph Howe Day Act in the legislature.  Whalen has been persistent in pointing out that the province has only five statutory holidays and has fallen further behind other provinces which have enacted a February holiday.

In April 2015, Whalen announced a cut to the Nova Scotia Film Tax Credit program. A controversial decision that was widely debated and protested. Several production studios and film productions in Halifax have cited this credit cut as the reason they've left or may have to leave Nova Scotia.

On July 24, 2015, McNeil shuffled his cabinet, moving Whalen to Minister of Justice.

On March 24, 2017, Whalen announced she will not run in the 2017 Nova Scotia general election.

Honours
In 2009, Whalen was honoured by the Cornwallis Progress Club with a Women of Distinction Award in the category of Public Affairs and Communications for her work in the community.

Electoral record

|-

|Liberal
|Diana Whalen
|align="right"|5,569
|align="right"|67.48
|align="right"|N/A
|-

|New Democratic Party
|Blake Wright
|align="right"|1,448
|align="right"|17.55
|align="right"|N/A
|-

|Progressive Conservative
|Jaime D. Allen
|align="right"|1,236
|align="right"|14.98
|align="right"|N/A
|}

|-
 
|Liberal
|Diana Whalen
|align="right"|5,030
|align="right"|49.02
|align="right"|
|-
 
|New Democratic Party
|Linda Power
|align="right"|3,924
|align="right"|38.24
|align="right"|
|-
 
|Progressive Conservative
|Debbie Hum
|align="right"|1,084
|align="right"|10.56
|align="right"|
|-

|Independent
|Jonathan Dean
|align="right"|51
|align="right"|0.50
|align="right"|
|}

|-
 
|Liberal
|Diana Whalen
|align="right"|3,404
|align="right"|37.32
|align="right"|
|-
 
|New Democratic Party
|Linda Power
|align="right"|3,040
|align="right"|33.33
|align="right"|
|-
 
|Progressive Conservative
|Mary Ann McGrath
|align="right"|2,450
|align="right"|26.86
|align="right"|
|-

|}

|-
 
|Liberal
|Diana Whalen
|align="right"|3,329
|align="right"|37.71
|align="right"|
|-
 
|Progressive Conservative
|Mary Ann McGrath
|align="right"|3,034
|align="right"|34.52
|align="right"|
|-
 
|New Democratic Party
|Roberta Morrison
|align="right"|2,312
|align="right"|26.14
|align="right"|
|-

|Independent
|Greg Lavern
|align="right"|152
|align="right"|1.72
|align="right"|
|}

2000 municipal elections of the Halifax Regional Municipality

See also 
 2007 Nova Scotia Liberal Party leadership election

References

External links
 Official website
 Members of the Nova Scotia Legislative Assembly
 Liberal caucus profile

1956 births
Living people
Nova Scotia Liberal Party MLAs
Dalhousie University alumni
Canadian people of Norwegian descent
Women MLAs in Nova Scotia
Members of the Executive Council of Nova Scotia
Deputy premiers of Nova Scotia
Halifax Regional Municipality councillors
Women municipal councillors in Canada
21st-century Canadian politicians
21st-century Canadian women politicians
Women government ministers of Canada
Finance ministers of Nova Scotia
Attorneys General of Nova Scotia
Female finance ministers
Female justice ministers